Sport Chorrillos is a Peruvian football club, playing in the city of Talara, Piura, Peru.

History
In the 1968 Copa Perú, the club classified to the Final Stage, with the Aurora Chancayllo of Chancay, Carlos A. Mannucci of Trujillo, Cienciano of the Cusco, FBC Melgar of Arequipa and Colegio Nacional de Iquitos. In the final stage, the club was runner-up.

Honours

National
Copa Perú: 0
 Runner-up (1): 1968

Liga Departamental de Piura: 1
Winners (1): 1968

See also
List of football clubs in Peru
Peruvian football league system

References 

Football clubs in Peru